Bjørn Myrseth (born 1944) is a Norwegian biologist and businessperson, and since 1987 chief executive officer of Marine Farms. Myrseth was educated in fishery biology from the University of Bergen, and was a co-founder of Stolt Sea Farms in 1972, where he was CEO until 1987. He then sold his stake in the company, and founded Marine Farms, where he continues as CEO.

References

1944 births
Living people
Norwegian company founders
Norwegian biologists
University of Bergen alumni